Arbetaren (The Worker) is a Swedish syndicalist newspaper. Founded in 1922, it has been published by the anarcho-syndicalist union SAC Syndikalisterna, first as a daily newspaper, then as a weekly magazine since 1958. As of 2013 the paper has a circulation of 2,500.

References

External links

1922 establishments in Sweden
Newspapers established in 1922
Weekly newspapers published in Sweden
Swedish-language newspapers
Anarchism in Sweden
Anarchist newspapers
Anarcho-syndicalism publications